Marcolf (Markolf, Markulf) is a German given name, literally "march-wulf".

It is notable as the name of the protagonist in the medieval German Jewish tale of Solomon and Marcolf, where Marcolf, or Marolf, is a type of the "wise fool" stock character.
 
Historical people called Markolf include Markolf, bishop of Mainz (12th century)

In modern Germany, Markolf is also a surname, e.g. that of German football player Stefan Markolf (b. 1984).

 
German given names